The Suicide King is a novel by Robert Joseph Levy. It is based on the American television series Buffy the Vampire Slayer. The first in the line of Buffy "Stake your Own Destiny" books, Suicide King gives the reader a large series of choices. Once a choice is made, the page number to turn to is given. The result is that the reader might decide the fate of the characters.

Plot summary
A number of student suicides has been taking place at Sunnydale High, shaking the community. Then the new grief counselor ends up killing himself, the Scoobies suspect that there is something supernatural to blame. Soon one of them shows suicidal signs and Buffy must race against time to defeat the ancient "Suicide King".

External links

Reviews
Teen-books.com – Reviews of this book

2005 American novels
Books based on Buffy the Vampire Slayer
Gamebooks
Novels about suicide